Olivia 'Livvy' Richardson Floren (née Richardson; born October 13, 1942) is an American public relations executive, philanthropist and former politician who served ten terms in the Connecticut House of Representatives from the 149th district from 2001 to 2021.

Early life and education 
Floren was born Olivia Richardson on October 13, 1942 in Manhattan, New York. She completed a Bachelor of Arts (AB) at Vassar College graduating in 1964. She later completed a Master of Business Administration at Adelphi University and a Master of Arts in Teaching (MAT) at Manhattanville College.

Career 
Floren initially worked as a Public Relations executive for Reddy Communications Incorporated in Greenwich, Connecticut from 1964 to 1986. Since 1986 she was a substitute teacher at Greenwich Country Day School and engaged as campaign manager for the Janet K. Lockton campaign, her predecessor in the Connecticut House of Representatives for the Republican Party. She has been a member and trustee of several civic organizations.

Philanthropy/Other 
Floren and her husband Doug are active philanthropists and had donated $10 million to Dartmouth College in Hanover, New Hampshire which was contributed towards construction of the Varsity House now bearing their family name. They also contributed an undisclosed amount to a $1.5m project on Tod's Point in Old Greenwich, Connecticut, which was opened as Floren Family Environmental Center in 2011. The family has two funding vehicles, Floren Family Foundation, and The Henry Gustav Floren Foundation both in Greenwich, Connecticut.

Politics 
She initially served on the Representative Town Meeting (RTM) in Greenwich for several years and was also a member of the town's Board of Estimate and Taxation. She was first elected to serve in the Connecticut House of Representatives in 2000, succeeding Janet Lockton. Floren served ten terms between 2001 and 2021. She was an assistant leader in her caucus, a ranking member of the legislatures bonding subcommittee and a member of the house's Finance, Revenue and Bonding Committee as well as the Insurance and Real Estate committee.

Personal life 
Floren is married to Douglas C. Floren (b. 1942). Floren, a 1964 graduate from Dartmouth College, co-founded DCF Capital in 1965 which would become a successful hedge fund and their primary source for family wealth. 

they have four children:

 Jennifer Floren Sozzi (b. 1971)
 Melissa Floren Filippone (b. 1975), married to David Filippone
 David Floren (b. 1978), a venture capitalist based in Mount Pleasant, South Carolina
 Clay Floren (b. 1978), a movie producer based in New York

She also has ten grandchildren. Floren has been a resident of Greenwich, Connecticut for over fifty years.

References

1942 births
Living people
21st-century American politicians
21st-century American women politicians
Politicians from New York City
Republican Party members of the Connecticut House of Representatives
Women state legislators in Connecticut